Outlaw was one of Canada's most iconic and feared red-and-white speckled Brahma longhorn bulls used for rodeo. He was born in 1997, and died at age 7 while fighting another bull in August 2004. He was purchased by the Calgary Stampede in 1999. He was honoured with a 2008-made heroic-sized bronze statue in Calgary where he was rode 71 times, and only ridden twice for the full eight seconds. He weighed 1,800 pounds (816 kilograms) and had 40-centimetre horns. He was also one of the most respected of famously-known Calgary bulls. Before his untimely 2004 death, he rang the bell to end the stock market in New York City's Wall Street in July. His offspring will live his legacy on after he participated in the 2003 Calgary Stampede. He's also posthumously featured on the poster for the 2010 Calgary Stampede.

References

Individual bulls
1997 animal births
2004 animal deaths